Sashalom is a neighbourhood within the XVI. district of Budapest. It is mostly a green and suburban environment away from traffic and businesses.

Sport
The oldest football and athletics team based in Sashalom, though originally from the neighbouring village, is Rákosszentmihályi AFC. The THSE Sashalom, currently playing in the 2017–18 Nemzeti Bajnokság III, is based in the 16th district of Budapest.

16th District of Budapest
Neighbourhoods of Budapest
Former municipalities of Hungary